The Best of Liverpool Express is a greatest hits compilation album by Liverpool Express, released in August 2002. It features all the band's hit recordings, and one new song, "John George Ringo & Paul" - a tribute to The Beatles.

Track listing
"You Are My Love" (Roger Craig, Billy Kinsley)
"Dreamin" (Craig, Kinsley)    
"Margie" (Kinsley)    
"Take It Easy With My Heart" (Kinsley)    
"Every Man Must Have a Dream" (Craig, Kinsley, Tony Coates)    
"I Want Nobody But You" (Kinsley)    
"It's a Beautiful Day" (Craig, Kinsley)    
"Julian the Hooligan" (Craig, Kinsley, Coates)    
"So Here I Go Again" (Kinsley)    
"John George Ringo & Paul" (Craig)    
"Smile" (Craig, Kinsley)     
"So What" (Kinsley, Kenny Parry)    
"Last Train Home" (Kinsley)    
"Hold Tight" (Craig, Kinsley)     
"Never Be the Same Boy" (Craig, Kinsley)    
"Don't Stop the Music" (Kinsley)

Personnel
Liverpool Express
Billy Kinsley – lead, harmony and backing vocals, bass guitar, acoustic guitar
Tony Coates – lead, harmony, and backing vocals, rhythm guitar, lead
Kenny Parry – lead, harmony, and backing vocals, rhythm guitar, lead ("So What")
Roger Scott Craig – harmony and backing vocals, piano
Dave Goldberg – harmony and backing vocals, piano ("So What")
Derek Cashin – harmony and backing vocals, drums
Pete Kircher – harmony and backing vocals, drums ("Take It Easy With My Heart", "I Want Nobody But You")
Brian Rawling – harmony and backing vocals, drums ("So What")

External links
Official Website

2002 greatest hits albums
Liverpool Express albums